Victory City is an unincorporated community in Bowie County, in the U.S. state of Texas. According to the Handbook of Texas, the community had a population of 250 in 2000. It is located within the Texarkana metropolitan area.

History
Victory City was founded in the early 1940s when the Lone Star Army Ammunition Plant was built and was platted at the entrance to the plant. It was renamed this for the "patriotic" sentiment while soldiers fought in World War II. While many residents worked at the plant, Victory City also had a few businesses and several scattered houses. Its population was recorded as 250 in 2000 and has a cemetery in Hooks.

Geography

Education
Victory City is served by the Leary Independent School District.

References

Unincorporated communities in Bowie County, Texas
Unincorporated communities in Texas